Platytes is a genus of moths of the family Crambidae.

Species
Platytes albipennella Hampson, 1896
Platytes alpinella (Hübner, 1813)
Platytes argyrotricha Hampson, 1908
Platytes atlantivolella Zerny, 1935
Platytes cerussella (Denis & Schiffermüller, 1775)
Platytes duplicilinea (Hampson, 1919)
Platytes ornatellus (Leech, 1889)
Platytes platysticha Turner, 1939
Platytes poliopepla Lower, 1905
Platytes strigatalis (Hampson, 1900)
Platytes vobisne Dyar, 1920

References

Natural History Museum Lepidoptera genus database

Crambini
Crambidae genera
Taxa named by Achille Guenée